Mõndelaid (also Mõndalaid) is a  islet on the western coast of Saaremaa island, Estonia. Administratively it belongs to Jõgela village, Lääne-Saare Parish, Saare County.

See also
 List of islands of Estonia

References

Estonian islands in the Baltic
Saaremaa Parish